Robert Chevis Nelson Jr. (born February 16, 1990) is an American football cornerback who is a free agent. He played college football at Louisiana–Monroe and Arizona State. He was signed by the Cleveland Browns as an undrafted free agent in 2014.

College career
Nelson attended the University of Louisiana at Monroe for two years before transferring to Arizona State University. As a senior in 2013, he was a first team All-Pac-12 selection.

Professional career

Cleveland Browns
Nelson was signed by the Cleveland Browns after going undrafted in the 2014 NFL Draft. He was released by the Browns on September 5, 2015.

Arizona Cardinals
Nelson was signed to the Arizona Cardinals' practice squad on September 7, 2015. On November 11, 2015, he was elevated to the active roster. On December 1, 2015, he was waived.

Houston Texans
Nelson was signed to the Houston Texans's practice squad on December 30, 2015. He signed a reserve/future contract with the Texans on January 11, 2016. On September 3, 2016, he was released by the Texans and was signed to the practice squad the next day. On October 13, 2016, he was promoted to the active roster.

On September 2, 2017, Nelson was waived by the Texans.

New England Patriots
On September 20, 2017, Nelson was signed to the New England Patriots' practice squad. He was released on September 25, 2017.

New York Jets
On September 26, 2017, Nelson was signed to the New York Jets' practice squad. He was promoted to the active roster on October 24, 2017. He was waived by the Jets on December 8, 2017.

Baltimore Ravens
On December 26, 2017, Nelson was signed to the Baltimore Ravens' practice squad. He signed a reserve/future contract with the Ravens on January 11, 2018. He was waived on June 11, 2018.

New Orleans Saints
On August 11, 2018, Nelson signed with the New Orleans Saints. He was waived on September 1, 2018.

Arizona Hotshots
In late 2018, Nelson joined the Arizona Hotshots of the Alliance of American Football. In the season opener against the Salt Lake Stallions, he intercepted quarterback Josh Woodrum in the first half. The league ceased operations in April 2019.

Houston Roughnecks
Nelson was drafted in the 2nd round during phase four in the 2020 XFL Draft by the Houston Roughnecks.

St. Louis BattleHawks
Nelson was traded to the St. Louis BattleHawks in exchange for offensive lineman Juwann Bushell-Beatty and cornerback Charles James on January 21, 2020. He had his contract terminated when the league suspended operations on April 10, 2020.

Montreal Alouettes
Nelson signed with the Montreal Alouettes of the CFL on June 30, 2021. He was released on July 26, 2021.

Arlington Renegades
Nelson was selected by the Arlington Renegades in the 2023 XFL Draft.

NFL statistics

References

External links
Cleveland Browns bio 
Arizona State Sun Devils bio

1990 births
Living people
Sportspeople from Lakeland, Florida
Players of American football from Florida
North Gwinnett High School alumni
American football safeties
American football cornerbacks
Louisiana–Monroe Warhawks football players
Arizona State Sun Devils football players
Cleveland Browns players
Arizona Cardinals players
Houston Texans players
New England Patriots players
New York Jets players
Baltimore Ravens players
New Orleans Saints players
Arizona Hotshots players
Houston Roughnecks players
St. Louis BattleHawks players
Montreal Alouettes players